This article lists the main weightlifting events and their results for 2012.

2012 Summer Olympics (IWF)
 ''The results below came from the IWF's 2012 Summer Olympics Results Page
 Men's 56 kg:   Om Yun-chol;   Wu Jingbiao;   Valentin Hristov
 Men's 62 kg:   Kim Un-guk;   Óscar Figueroa;   Eko Yuli Irawan
 Men's 69 kg:   Lin Qingfeng;   Triyatno;   Răzvan Martin
 Men's 77 kg:   Lü Xiaojun;   Lu Haojie;   Iván Cambar
 Men's 85 kg:   Adrian Zieliński;   Kianoush Rostami;   Tarek Yehia
 Men's 94 kg:   Saeid Mohammadpour;   Kim Min-jae;   Tomasz Zieliński
 Men's 105 kg:   Oleksiy Torokhtiy;   Navab Nassirshalal;   Bartłomiej Bonk
 Men's +105 kg:   Behdad Salimi;   Sajjad Anoushiravani;   Ruslan Albegov
 Women's 48 kg:   Wang Mingjuan;   Hiromi Miyake;   Ryang Chun-hwa
 Women's 53 kg:   Hsu Shu-ching;   Citra Febrianti;   Iulia Paratova
 Women's 58 kg:   Li Xueying;   Pimsiri Sirikaew;   Rattikan Gulnoi
 Women's 63 kg:   Christine Girard;   Milka Maneva;   Luz Acosta
 Women's 69 kg:   Rim Jong-sim;   Roxana Cocoș;   Anna Nurmukhambetova
 Women's 75 kg:   Lydia Valentín;   Abeer Abdelrahman;   Madias Nzesso
 Women's +75 kg:   Zhou Lulu;   Tatiana Kashirina;   Jang Mi-ran

World & Grand Prix weightlifting championships
 May 10 – ?: 2012 World Junior Weightlifting Championships in  Antigua Guatemala
  won both the gold and overall medal tallies.
 September 18 – ?: 2012 World Youth Weightlifting Championships in  Košice
  and  won 3 gold medals each. Russia won the overall medal tally.
 October 12: – ?: 2012 IWF Grand Prix #1 in  Saint Petersburg
 Men's 94 kg:  Egor Klimonov
 Men's 105 kg:  Gennady Muratov
 Men's +105 kg:  Jiří Orság
 Women's 75 kg:  Olga Zubova
 Women's +75 kg:  Tatiana Kashirina
 November 5 – ?: 2012 World University Weightlifting Championships in  Eilat
  won both the gold and overall medal tallies.
 December 14 – ?: 2012 IWF Grand Prix #2 in  Baku
 Men's 62 kg:  Valentin Hristov
 Men's 69 kg:  Firidun Guliyev
 Women's 53 kg:  Cristina Iovu
 Women's 58 kg:  Tatiana Aleeva

Continental & regional weightlifting championships
 March 20 – ?: 2012 Pan American Junior Weightlifting Championships in  Medellín
  won the gold medal tally. Colombia and  won 11 overall medals each.
 March 29 – ?: 2012 African Weightlifting Championships in  Nairobi
  won both the gold and overall medal tallies.
 April 9 – ?: 2012 European Weightlifting Championships in  Antalya
  won both the gold and overall medal tallies.
 April 22 – ?: 2012 Asian Weightlifting Championships in  Pyeongtaek
  won both the gold and overall medal tallies.
 May 10 – ?: 2012 Pan American Weightlifting Championships in  Antigua Guatemala
  won both the gold and overall medal tallies.
 June 4 – ?: 2012 Oceania Senior, Junior, & Youth Weightlifting Championships in  Apia
 Senior:  won the gold medal tally.  won the overall medal tally.
 Junior:  and  won 3 gold medals each. Samoa won the overall medalt tally.
 Youth:  won the gold medal tally.  won the overall medal tally.
 June 4 – ?: 2012 Commonwealth Senior, Junior, & Youth Weightlifting Championships in  Apia
 Senior:  won both the gold and overall medal tallies.
 Junior:  won both the gold and overall medal tallies.
 Youth:  won both the gold and overall medal tallies.
 June 18 – ?: 2012 Pan American Youth Weightlifting Championships in  Viña del Mar
  won the gold medal tally.  won the overall medal tally.
 August 25 – ?: 2012 European Youth Weightlifting Championships in  Constanța
  won the gold medal tally.  won the overall medal tally.
 October 24 – ?: 2012 South American Senior & Junior Weightlifting Championships in  Maracaibo
 Senior:  won both the gold and overall medal tallies.
 Junior:  won both the gold and overall medal tallies.
 November 8 – ?: 2012 Asian Junior & Youth Weightlifting Championships in  Yangon
 Junior:  and  won 5 gold medals each. China won the overall medal tally.
 Youth:  won the gold medal tally.  won the overall medal tally.
 November 18 – ?: 2012 African Junior & Youth Weightlifting Championships in  Tunis
 Junior:  won the gold medal tally.  won the overall medal tally.
 Youth:  won both the gold and overall medal tallies.
 November 29 – ?: 2012 European Junior Weightlifting Championships in  Eilat
  and  won 4 gold medals each. Russia won the overall medal tally.

References

External links
 International Weightlifting Federation Website

 
Weightlifting by year
2012 in sports